Dzianis Zuev (born April 3, 1988) is a Belarusian welterweight kickboxer. A professional competitor since 2012, he is the 2014 Kunlun Fight welterweight tournament winner.

Zuev was ranked as a top ten lightweight by Combat Press between September and November 2017, as well as between July and November 2021.

Kickboxing career  
Zuev began boxing at the age of 16 and kickboxing at the age of 20. Sponsored by Kunlun Fight, Zuev relocated to China to donate boxing gloves and teach boxing to local disadvantaged children in hopes that they might improve their lives through boxing. 

Zuev participated in the 2016 Kunlun Fight welterweight tournament, and was scheduled to face Jonay Risco in the Group A semifinal bout at Kunlun Fight 38 on February 21, 2016. He won the fight by unanimous decision, and would go on to beat Liu Lei in the same manner in the group finals. He would however lose to Davit Kiria in the quarterfinals of the tournament proper.

Zuev challenged Jonay Risco for the Enfusion welterweight title at Enfusion Live 40 on June 4, 2016. He lost the fight by unanimous decision.

Zuev took part in the 2017 Kunlun Fight welterweight tournament, and faced Liu Lei in the round of 16 bout at Kunlun Fight 60 on April 23, 2017. Zuev won the fight by a first-round technical knockout and was scheduled to fight Feng Xingli in the tournament quarterfinals at Kunlun Fight 65 on August 27, 2017. He won the fight by a second-round technical knockout. Zuev was set to fight Yohann Drai in the Kunlun Fight final four qualification bout, which was held at Kunlun Fight 67 on November 12, 2017. He won the fight by split decision. Zuev faced Marat Grigorian in the semifinals of the Kunlun Fight welterweight tournament, held at Kunlun Fight 69 on February 4, 2018. Grigorian won the fight by unanimous decision.

Zuev faced Vlad Tuinov in the quarterfinals of the Kunlun Fight welterweight tournament, which began at Kunlun Fight 77 on October 13, 2018. He won the fight by majority decision and was set to face Marouan Toutouh at Kunlun Fight 80 on February 24, 2019, in the tournament semifinals. Toutouh won the fight by unanimous decision.

Zuev was scheduled to face Jiao Fukai in the quarterfinals of the next Kunlun Fight tournament, which began at Kunlun Fight 81 on July 27, 2019. He lost the fight by majority decision.

Zuev was scheduled to face Nabil Igli at Kunlun Combat Professional League - Shenzhen vs. Shanghai - League Playoff Quarterfinal  on November 17, 2019. He won the fight by a second-round technical knockout. Zuev was scheduled to face Zhao Junchen at Kunlun Fight 88 on December 25, 2019. He won the fight by decision.

Zuev was scheduled to face Dmitriy Filonchik in the quarterfinals of the BFC 72kg tournament, held at BFC 56 on July 9, 2020. He knocked Filonchik down twice enroute to a decision victory.

Zuev was scheduled to face Frederic Berichon at Nuit Des Champions 28 on November 20, 2021. Zuev was later forced to withdraw from the bout due to visa issues.

Replacing Amier Abdulahad on short notice on February 12, 2022, Zuev faced Stoyan Koprivlenski at Fair Fight XVI. He lost the fight via unanimous decision.

Zuev faced Jérémy Payet in the main event of Cicada Fight Championship on May 21, 2022. He won the fight by a third-round knockout.

Titles 
Kunlun Fight
2014 Kunlun Fight World Max Tournament Champion

Professional kickboxing record 
 
  
|-  style="background:#cfc;"
|2022-06-25
|Win
|align="left" | Jérémy Payet
|Kunlun Fight & Cicada Fight
|Dubai, UAE
|KO (Punches)
|3
|
|-
|-style="background:#fbb;"
| 2022-02-12 
|Loss 
|align=left| Stoyan Koprivlenski 
| Fair Fight XVI 
| Yekaterinburg, Russia 
| Decision (Unanimous) 
| 3 
| 3:00 
|-
|-  style="background:#cfc;"
|2020-07-09
|Win
|align="left" | Dmitriy Filonchik
|BFC 56 - Tournament Quarterfinal
|Minsk, Belarus
|Decision
|3
|3:00
|-
|-  style="background:#cfc;"
|2019-12-25
|Win
|align="left" | Zhao Junchen
|Kunlun Fight 88
|Yiwu, China
|Decision
|3
|3:00
|-
|-style="background:#cfc;"
|2019-11-17
|Win|| align="left" | Nabil Igli
|Kunlun Combat Professional League - Shenzhen vs. Shanghai - League Playoff Quarterfinal
|Tongling, China
|TKO
|2
|2:38

|-
|-style="background:#cfc;"
|2019-10-03
|Win
|align="left" | Ouyang Feng
|Kunlun Fight 86
|Tongliao, China || Decision (Unanimous)
|3
|3:00

|-
|-style="background:#cfc;"
|2019-09-14
|Win
|align="left" | Artem Pashporin
|Kunlun Fight 83
|Guizhou, China || Decision (Split)
|3
|3:00
|-style="background:#fbb;"
|2019-07-27
|Loss
|align="left" | Jiao Fukai
|Kunlun Fight 81, Tournament Quarterfinals
|Beijing, China
|Decision (Majority)
|3
|3:00
|-
|-style="background:#fbb;"
|2019-02-24
|Loss
|align="left" | Marouan Toutouh
|Kunlun Fight 80, Tournament Semifinals
|Shanghai, China
|Decision (Unanimous)
|3
|3:00
|-
|-style="background:#cfc;"
|2018-10-13
|Win
|align="left" | Vlad Tuinov
|Kunlun Fight 77, Tournament Quarterfinals
|Tongling, China
|Decision (Majority)
|3
|3:00
|-
|-style="background:#cfc;"
|2018-08-05
|Win
|align="left" | Victor Nagbe
|Kunlun Fight 75
|Sanya, China
|Decision (Majority)
|3
|3:00
|-style="background:#fbb;"
|2018-06-01
|Loss
|align=left| Superbon Banchamek
|Kunlun Fight Macao
|Macau || Decision (Unanimous)
|3
|3:00
|-
|-style="background:#fbb;"
|2018-04-01
|Loss
|align=left| Jomthong Chuwattana
|Kunlun Fight 71
|Qingdao, China
|Decision (Split)
|3
|3:00
|-style="background:#fbb;"
|2018-02-04
|Loss
|align=left| Marat Grigorian
|Kunlun Fight 69, Tournament Semi Finals
|Guyang, China
|Decision (Unanimous)
|3
|3:00 
|-
|-style="background:#cfc;"
|2017-11-12
|Win 
|align=left| Yohann Drai
|Kunlun Fight 67 - World MAX 2017 Final 8 
|Sanya, China 
|Decision (Majority) 
|3 
|3:00 
|-
!style=background:white colspan=9 |
|-style="background:#cfc;"
|2017-08-27 
|Win 
|align="left" | Feng Xingli
|Kunlun Fight 65 70 kg World Max 2017  Tournament 1/8 Finals
|Qingdao, China
|TKO (Ref.stop/4 Knockdowns)
|2 
|
|-
!style=background:white colspan=9 |
|-style="background:#cfc;"
|2017-06-10 
|Win 
|align="left" | Elam Chavez
|Kunlun Fight 62
|Bangkok, Thailand 
|Decision (Unanimous) 
|3 
|3:00
|-style="background:#cfc;"
|2017-04-23 
|Win 
|align="left" | Liu Lei 
|Kunlun Fight 60 70 kg World Max 2017 Group F Tournament Final
|Zunyi, China
|TKO (Ref.stop/3 Knockdowns)
|1 
|2:18
|-
!style=background:white colspan=9 |
|-style="background:#cfc;"
|2017-04-23 
|Win 
|align="left" | Arthit Hanchana
|Kunlun Fight 60 70 kg World Max 2017 Group F Tournament Semi-finals
|Zunyi, China
|KO (Left Hook) 
|3 
|0:58
|-style="background:#fbb;"
|2017-01-01 
|Loss 
|align="left" | Mohamed Mezouari 
|Kunlun Fight 56 70 kg 2016 Tournament Reserve Fight
|Sanya, China 
|Decision (Unanimous) 
|3 
|3:00
|-style="background:#cfc;"
|2016-10-30 
|Win 
|align="left" | Dzhabar Askerov 
|Kunlun Fight 54
|Hubei, China 
|Ex.R Decision (Unanimous) 
|4 
|3:00
|-style="background:#fbb;"
|2016-09-11 
|Loss 
|align="left" | Davit Kiria 
|Kunlun Fight 52 70 kg 2016 Tournament 1/8 Finals
|Fuzhou, China 
|Decision (Unanimous) 
|3 
|3:00
|-style="background:#fbb;"
|2016-06-04
|Loss 
|align="left" | Jonay Risco
|Enfusion Live 40
|Gran Canaria, Spain
|Decision (Unanimous) 
|3 
|3:00
|-
!style=background:white colspan=9 |
|-style="background:#cfc;"
|2016-02-21 
|Win 
|align="left" | Liu Lei 
|Kunlun Fight 38 70 kg World Max 2016 Group A Tournament Final
|Pattaya, Thailand 
|Decision (Unanimous) 
|3 
|3:00
|-
! style=background:white colspan=9 |
|-style="background:#cfc;"
|2016-02-21 
|Win 
|align="left" | Jonay Risco 
|Kunlun Fight 38 70 kg World Max 2016 Group A Tournament Semi-finals
|Pattaya, Thailand 
|Decision (Unanimous) 
|3 
|3:00
|-style="background:#cfc;"
|2016-01-09 
|Win 
|align="left" | Armin Pumpanmuang Windy Sport 
|Kunlun Fight 36
|Shanghai, China 
|Decision (Unanimous) 
|3 
|3:00
|-style="background:#fbb;"
|2015-10-28 
|Loss 
|align="left" | Victor Nagbe 
|Kunlun Fight 32 70 kg 2015 Tournament 1/8 Finals
|Dazhou, China
|Ex.R Decision (Unanimous) 
|4 
|3:00
|-style="background:#fbb;"
|2015-06-07 
|Loss 
|align="left" | Yodsanklai Fairtex
|Kunlun Fight 26
|Chongqing, China
|Decision (unanimous)
|3
|3:00
|-style="background:#cfc;"
|2015-04-26 
|Win 
|align="left" | Nonsai Sor.Sanyakorn
|Kunlun Fight 23
|Changsha, China 
|TKO (Cut) 
|2
|
|-style="text-align:center; background:#cfc;"
|2014-11-16 
|Win 
|align="left" | Victor Nagbe 
|Kunlun Fight 13 – 70 kg 2014 Tournament Final
|Hohhot, China
|Decision (Unanimous) 
|3 
|3:00
|-
!style=background:white colspan=9 |
|- style="background:#cfc;"
|2014-11-16 
|Win 
|align="left" | Aikpracha Meenayothin 
|Kunlun Fight 13 – 70 kg 2014 Tournament Semifinals
|Hohhot, China
|KO (punch) 
|3
|
|- style="text-align:center; background:#fbb;"
|2014-10-05 
|Loss 
|align="left" | Mustapha Haida
|Kunlun Fight 11 – 70 kg 2014 Tournament Quarter-finals
|Macao, China 
|Decision (Unanimous) 
|3 
|3:00
|-
!style=background:white colspan=9 |
|- style="background:#cfc;"
|2014-07-27 
|Win 
|align="left" | Feng Xingli 
|Kunlun Fight 7 – 70 kg 2014 Tournament 1/8 Finals
|Zhoukou, China
|Decision (Unanimous) 
|3 
|3:00
|-
! style=background:white colspan=9 |
|- style="background:#fbb;"
|2012-08-08 
|Loss 
|align="left" | Farkhad Akhmedjanov 
| Knockout Show Mustang
|Minsk, Belarus 
|Decision (Unanimous) 
|3 
|3:00
|-
| colspan=9 | Legend:

See also
 List of male kickboxers

References

1988 births
Living people
Belarusian male kickboxers
Middleweight kickboxers
Kunlun Fight kickboxers
Kunlun Fight kickboxing champions